Union Township is one of nine townships in Crawford County, Indiana. As of the 2010 census, its population was 761 and it contained 384 housing units.

History
The Potts Creek Rockshelter was listed on the National Register of Historic Places in 1987.

Geography

Unincorporated towns
 Grantsburg
 Mifflin
 Sulphur
 West Fork
(This list is based on USGS data and may include former settlements.)

Adjacent townships
 Sterling Township (northeast)
 Ohio Township (southeast)
 Oil Township, Perry County (southwest)
 Johnson Township (west)
 Patoka Township (northwest)

Major highways
  Interstate 64
  Indiana State Road 37
  Indiana State Road 62
  Indiana State Road 66

Cemeteries
The township contains five cemeteries: Doan, Fessler, Goad, Hedden, Mifflin, and Keysacker.

References
 United States Census Bureau cartographic boundary files
 U.S. Board on Geographic Names

External links

 Indiana Township Association
 United Township Association of Indiana

Townships in Crawford County, Indiana
Townships in Indiana